Reynard the Fox is a literary cycle of allegorical French, Dutch, English and German fables concerned with Reynard, an anthropomorphic red fox and trickster figure.

Reynard may also refer to:
 Reynard Motorsport, a former British race car chassis manufacturer
 HMS Reynard, or HMS Renard, ten ships of the Royal Navy
 Renard (Stravinsky), one-act opera by Igor Stravinsky (spelled either way)
 Renard, short for Reynardine, a fox-like character in webcomic Gunnerkrigg Court (often misspelled as Reynard)
 Reynard, a 1970s acid folk band from Liverpool

Surname
 Adrian Reynard (born 1951), English, founder of Reynard Motorsport
 Helene Reynard (1875–1947), Economist and college administrator
 Paul Reynard (1927–2005), French-American painter

See also
 Reinhard

Surnames from given names